Rust is the third studio album by the American hardcore band Harm's Way. Released on March 10, 2015 through Deathwish Inc., Rust—like the preceding EP, Blinded—was produced by Andy Nelson of the powerviolence band Weekend Nachos. The album was sonically influenced by Godflesh, Helmet and Celtic Frost, and Harm's Way promoted its release with a stream for "Law of the Land" and music videos for "Amongst the Rust" and "Left to Disintegrate."

The album received generally positive reviews from music critics. Writing for Rock Sound Chris Hidden gave the album an eight-out-of-ten score, and stated: "This new record finds [Harm's Way] in formidable form, with the likes of 'Amongst The Rust' and 'Cancerous Ways' blending the down-tuned riff attack of nu metal with groove-led thrash and the crushing intensity of hardcore to produce a sound that references everyone from Sepultura to Trapped Under Ice." Writing for SLUG Magazine, Alex Cragun praised the album and said with its, "charging drums and hammering bass, Rust is everything but rust."

Track listing 
All songs written and performed by Harm's Way.
 "Infestation" – 3:24
 "Law of the Land" – 3:14
 "Cremation" – 2:44
 "Hope" – 2:39
 "Cancerous Ways" – 3:40
 "Amongst the Rust" – 2:50
 "Left to Disintegrate" – 4:26
 "Docile Bodies" – 2:11
 "Turn to Stone" – 4:22
 "Ease My Mind" – 4:20

Personnel 
Rust personnel adapted from CD liner notes.

Harm's Way 
 Jay Jancetic – guitars, vocals
 Bohan Lueders – guitars, vocals
 Christopher Mills – drums
 James Pligge – vocals

Additional musicians 
 Emily Jancetic – guest vocals on "Turn to Stone"
 Colin Young – guest vocals on "Amongst the Rust"

Production and artwork 
 Kurt Ballou – mixing
 Jacob Bannon – additional design
 Brad Boatright – mastering
 Andy Nelson – engineering
 E. Aaron Ross – photography, design

References

External links 
 Rust on Bandcamp

2015 albums
Harm's Way (band) albums
Deathwish Inc. albums
Albums produced by Kurt Ballou